Abe Pineles is an American North American champion bridge player and an American Contract Bridge League (ACBL) Grand Life Master.

Bridge accomplishments

Wins
 North American Bridge Championships (1) 
 Truscott Senior Swiss Teams (1) 2022

Personal life
Abe is married to Greta. They have two daughters.

References

American contract bridge players
Living people
1948 births